John Patrick Scarlett (29 May 1947 – 31 July 2019) was an Australian rules footballer who played for Geelong and South Melbourne. Scarlett was a fullback and his son Matthew played in that same position for Geelong.

Scarlett was a reserve in the 1967 VFL Grand Final

References

External links

1947 births
2019 deaths
Australian rules footballers from Victoria (Australia)
Geelong Football Club players
St Joseph's Football Club players
Sydney Swans players